Ukanje is a settlement in the hills west of Kanal in the Littoral region of Slovenia on the border with Italy.

Church

The local church stands in the hamlet of Britof and is dedicated to Saint Cantianus. It belongs to the Parish of Marijino Celje in the Diocese of Koper. It is a Gothic church with a bell gable, built in 1505. The interior houses a Gothic side altar (a replica, the original is kept in the National Gallery of Slovenia), a gilded Baroque altar, and Gothic frescoes. The church is protected as a cultural monument of local significance.

References

External links

Ukanje on Geopedia
Ukanje on Google Maps (map, photographs, street view)

Populated places in the Municipality of Kanal